Man O Man was an Australian television game show that was broadcast of the Seven Network in 1994. Hosted by stage actor Rob Guest and Jason Body, the program was based on the original German version of the same name.

Program synopsis
The program was presented loosely in the format of a male beauty pageant whereby an all-female audience voted for the winner via a series of elimination rounds. Notably, losing contestants would be pushed into a swimming pool.

The program prompted an unusual amount of letters to the Green Guide in The Age, the masthead publishing a selection of these letters.

The final episode of Man O Man, which aired on 25 November 1994, was a Footballers Challenge special that featured players from Australian rules football, rugby league and soccer.

The episode was more risqué than usual, with some footballers performing a striptease for the talent act round.

Man O Man returned briefly to the Seven Network on 26 January 1997 when the first episode was repeated as part of the network's Coca-Cola Interactive Summer Night promotion. However, the show has not been repeated since.

Man O Man was filmed at the Seven Network Melbourne studios located in South Melbourne. The studio which was used for the show is currently utilised as the Dancing with the Stars dance floor set.

The series established itself as prime competition for the long-running program Hey Hey It's Saturday. In a 1994 article in TV Week, Rob Guest responded to criticism made by Daryl Somers (host of the rival show), saying, "When you’ve been doing a show for 23 years and a show that is not expected to do well comes up and knocks you for six, then you’re not going to take it very well. So I can understand why Daryl would say things like that".

International versions

See also 
 List of Australian television series
 List of Seven Network programs

References

External links
 
Man O Man at the National Film and Sound Archive

Man O Man
1990s Australian game shows
Seven Network original programming
1994 Australian television series debuts
1994 Australian television series endings
Television series by Fremantle (company)
Television series by Reg Grundy Productions
Television shows set in Melbourne